Quirosena is a genus of gastropods in the subfamily Hadrinae belonging to the family Camaenidae.

Species
 Quirosena bougainvillei (L. Pfeiffer, 1860)
 Quirosena scorteus (Vanatta, 1930)

References

 Bank, R. A. (2017). Classification of the Recent terrestrial Gastropoda of the World. Last update: July 16th, 2017
 Delsaerdt, A., 2012 Land snails on the Solomon Islands. Volume 2. Camaenidae, p. 178 pp

External links
 Iredale, T. (1941). A basic list of the land Mollusca of Papua. The Australian Zoologist. 10(1): 51-94, pls. 3-4

Camaenidae